Radio stations that broadcast in the Tamil language are found primarily in India, Sri Lanka, Malaysia, Singapore, United Kingdom, United States, South Africa, Canada as well as other parts of the world containing a significant Tamil diaspora population.

Africa

SA தமிழ் Radio (உங்கள் தமிழ் வானொலி – South Africa's Tamil radio station)

Lotus FM (Lotus FM – South Africa's Indian radio station – Tamil, Hindi, Telugu, Gujarati)

Australia
Australian Tamil Broadcasting Corporation (ATBC)
SBS Radio Australia  (அஸ்திரேலிய அரசாங்க வானொலி நிலையம்)

Canada
Radio Dhool

A9RADIO – ஏ9வானொலி தமிழ் – Tamil Online Radio Toronto, Ontario, Canada

Canadian Tamil Broadcasting Corporation (கனடிய தமிழ் ஒலிபரப்பு கூட்டுத்தாபனம்)

CMR Tamil FM – CMR Tamil FM in Toronto, Ontario, Canada

Vanakkam FM – CJVF-FM in Toronto, Ontario, Canada

International Tamil Radio in Montreal, Quebec, Canada

Velicham FM –  in Toronto, Ontario, Canada

Tamilthai FM – Toronto, Ontario, Canada

Thaalam FM  (தாளம் தமிழ் வானொலி)

Tamil Star Radio  (தமிழ் வானொலி)

Canadian Thamil Radio  (கனேடிய தமிழ் வானொலி)

Kalasam Radio – Kalasam Tamil free online radio

Vanakkam Calgary (வணக்கம் கால்கரி) – Calgary Tamil Radio Program

Chennai Radio, Internet radio station, Brampton.

Radio Tamil Voice - (தமிழ்க்குரல் வானொலி) Online Tamil Radio

China

Cheena (China) Tamil Radio சீன வானொலி

France
 Tamil Olli Radio  (தமிழ்ஒலி வானொலி) – from Tamil Television Network, France
 THHR FM  (TAMIL-HIP-HOP-RADIO) from Like-Xa Média Network, France

India

Anbu Fm Tamil Online Radio

All India radio services in Tamil Nadu
FM – Frequency Modulation services:

Medium Wave service: (table sorted in the order of oldest radio station first)

Shortwave service:

Digital Radio Mondiale – DRM service 
Currently DRM digital radio channels are in the testing stage.

Chennai 'A' 730 kHz

Chennai Vividh Bharti 793 kHz

Chennai 'B' 1027 kHz

Tirunelveli 1207 kHz

Tiruchirapalli 946 kHz

Bengaluru 522 kHz (To cover Erode, Dharmapuri, Nilgiri, Vellore, Salem)

News on AIR service by All India Radio
The latest regional news bulletins in Tamil language can be heard in audio format.

The latest national news bulletins in Tamil language can be heard in audio format

The latest regional and national news are also in text format. This website is updated twice every day.

Private broadcasters

 Annai FM (SubSun Radio) Karaikkadu, Parakkunru, Kuzhithurai, Kanyakumari, Tamilnadu. Internet Radio Station. 

 Suryan FM (93.5) (Chennai, Trichy, Coimbatore, Madurai, Tirunelveli,Thoothukudi & Pudhucherry (Salem & Vellore-93.9), (Erode-91.9) As (Red FM) in other states Owned By (Sun TV Network Ltd India.)
 Hello FM (106.4 FM) (Chennai, Coimbatore, Madurai, Tiruchirapalli, Tirunelveli, Thoothukudi & Puducherry), (Salem & Vellore- 91.5 & Erode – 92.7)Owned By Malar publications India.
 Radio Mirchi (98.3 FM) (Chennai, Coimbatore, Madurai) (Tirunelveli & Trichy-95 ) Owned By Entertainment Network India Ltd (ENIL)
 Radio City (91.1 FM) (Chennai, Coimbatore, Madurai) Owned By Music Broadcast Private Limited India.
 Fever 104(91.9 FM) (Chennai) Owned By HT Media Ltd.
 Big FM (92.7 FM) (Chennai, Puducherry) Owned By Reliance Broadcast Network Ltd India.
 Radio One (94.3 FM) (Hindi) (Chennai) Owned By Next MediaWorks India. and BBC Worldwide
 Chennai Live (104.1 FM, 104.8 FM) (Chennai)
 
 ASR DIGITAL RADIO (ONLINE RADIO) (Tamilnadu, India, World), Owned By ASR DIGITAL MULTIMEDIA.
 ASR DIGITAL RADIO ( Fm ) Tamil Online Radio ( www.radio.asrdmm.com)
 AGN CRS (91.2 FM) (AGN.Mat.Hr.Sec.School.Konganapuram)
 Anbu Fm Tamil Online Radio ( www.anbufm.com)
 Theydal FM (89.3 FM) Tamil Nadu (coming soon)
MJOY FM
JN FM TAMIL online radio ( https://jnfmtamil.wixsite.com/jnfmtamil)
RADIO JN online radio ( http://jnfmtamil.webradiosite.com/)
Valipokan FM - Internet radio by Valipokan.com (https://www.valipokan.com/live-radio-station/)
Vaigai FM - Internet Radio Station. https://vaigaifm.co.in

Puducherry (Union Territory of India)

All India Radio services in Puducherry
FM – Frequency Modulation services:

Medium Wave service:

Pakistan
 Pakistan Broadcasting Corporation

Malaysia
 Minnal FM
 THR Raaga (formerly TIME Highway Radio)

Mauritius
 ONEX FM Radio

Singapore
Oli 96.8FM (Mediacorp formerly known as Singapore Broadcasting Corporation Radio 4 1980–1994)

Sri Lanka  
 Sri Lanka Broadcasting Corporation (இலங்கை ஒலிபரப்பு கூட்டுத்தாபனம்), previously Radio Ceylon, Ceylon Broadcasting Corporation.
 FM99
 Shakthi FM
 Sooriyan FM
 Vasantham FM
 Varnam FM
 capital fm
 FM
 IMAI FM

Switzerland
 Sivan Kovil's – Bakthi Malargal Devotional FM Radio  (சிவன் கோவிலின்-பக்தி மலர்கள் வானொலி)

UK
 BBC Tamil World Service (தமிழோசை – பிபிசி உலக சேவை) in London

Vatican City
Radio Vaticana வத்திக்கான் வானொலி

United States

 Radio Dhool –  Exclusive 24/7 Tamil Radio.
 US Tamil Fm
 Shuddh Desi Radio

Global
 Ezhisai FM, Ezhisai FM From Tamil Nadu (Pattukkottai – Chennai).
 Thenral World Radio (TWR), from Germany.
 ETR FM (live from Germany), European Tamils union E.V
 Alai FM (live from Chennai), Alai Network
 DAN Tamil Alai (Dish Asia Network) – from Sri Lanka
 TamilKushi
 TBC London (Tamil Broadcasting Corporation) – pro-Sri Lankan government, operated by Karuna paramilitary group from London
 Tamil International Radio – pro-Sri Lankan government, operated by EPDP paramilitary group from Sri Lanka
 Tamils Flash FM – the first Tamil Youth online radio
 Listen to Tamil language radio online free
 Ezhisai FM, Ezhisai FM From Tamil Nadu (Pattukkottai – Chennai).
 Theophony Tamil Isai, Listen to Theophony Tamil Isai online, live streaming From Karnataka (Bangalore).
 Vadivelu Comedy Radio, Listen to Vadivelu comedy audios 
 ASR DIGITAL RADIO Tamil Tamil Radio Station with only Tamil Songs
 Vaigai FM Tamil Radio Station from Tamilnadu (Rajapalayam - Virudhunagar Dt)

Online Tamil Radio Stations 

 AIR Tamil Online broadcast of All India Radio Tamil
 Radio city Tamil Dedicated Online Tamil Radio Channel by Radio City
 3D PURADSIFM Tamil Songs and special programs are played
 ILAYARAJA RADIO
 SPB RADIO
 Anbu FM Tamil Online Radio Online Tamil Radio Station for 24hrs hit tamil songs
 Vadivelu Comedy radio
 Star Radio Tamil Tamil Radio Station with only Tamil Songs & no Ads
 ASR DIGITAL RADIO Tamil Tamil Radio Station with only Tamil Songs
 JN FM TAMIL Tamil online radio station https://jnfmtamil.wixsite.com/jnfmtamil
 RADIO JN Tamil online radio station tamil songs only Http://jnfmtamil.webradiosite.com/
 Valipokan FM – Internet radio 
Vaigai FM – Internet Radio Station | https://vaigaifm.co.in

See also
 Broadcasting in Chennai
 Tamil Language Media
 List of Sri Lankan broadcasters

References 

Lists of radio stations by language
Lists of radio stations in India